Anssi Ilari Melametsä (born June 21, 1961) is a Finnish former professional ice hockey player who played in the National Hockey League and SM-liiga. He played for Jokerit, HIFK, and the Winnipeg Jets. Internationally he represented Finland at several World Championships and at the 1984 Winter Olympics.

Career statistics

Regular season and playoffs

International

External links 
 

1961 births
Living people
Finnish expatriate ice hockey players in Canada
Finnish ice hockey players
HIFK (ice hockey) players
Ice hockey players at the 1984 Winter Olympics
Jokerit players
KooKoo players
Olympic ice hockey players of Finland
Sportspeople from Jyväskylä
Peterborough Petes (ice hockey) players
Sherbrooke Canadiens players
Winnipeg Jets (1979–1996) draft picks
Winnipeg Jets (1979–1996) players